Whitchurch Park is a council ward located in the south of the city of Bristol in England. It includes the eastern part of Hartcliffe and the western part of Whitchurch.  The ward has a population of 11,061 people.

Religion
7,683 people, or 69.5% of the population are Christians.  This is a higher figure than the average for the city of Bristol. 21% of people identified themselves as non religious, while 7.8% did not state their religion in the census. The figures for all other religions were below 1%.

Politics
The ward is in the Bristol South constituency for representation in the House of Commons.
The councillors for the ward are Timothy Kent (Liberal Democrat) and Helen Holland (Labour)

References

Wards of Bristol